The Last Leprechaun is a BBC-broadcast television fantasy film of 1998, directed by David Lister and starring Veronica Hamel, Jack Scalia, and Mick Walter.

Plot
Tommy and Ethel Barridge, the children of multi-millionaire American business man Henry Barridge, go to Ireland to spend the summer holidays with Laura Duvall, who is engaged to marry their father. However, they find she is a wicked banshee with strong black magic powers who does not wish them well. Laura is busy cutting down trees on her estate and is also planning the destruction of the last king of the little people, or leprechauns. Tommy and Ethel take his side against their wicked future stepmother.

Cast
 Veronica Hamel as Laura Duvann
 Jack Scalia as Henry Barridge
 Brittney Bomann as Ethel Barridge 
 Andrew J. Ferchland as Tommy Barridge
 David Warner as Simpson, Laura Duvann's Butler
 Mick Walter as Finn Regan McCool, The Leprechaun
 Victor Melleney as Farmer Ned
 Douglas Bristow as Sam
 Jocelyn Broderick as Mary, Laura Duvann's Cook
 Wilson Dunster as Foreman
 Anthony Bishop as Logger
 Nicky Rebelo as Kim
 Alessandra Bowles as Being

Notes

Films about fairies and sprites
1998 films
BBC children's television shows
BBC Film films
British fantasy films
Films directed by David Lister
1990s British films